Barkin Ladi (or Barakin Ladi) is a Local Government Area in Plateau State, Nigeria.

It has an area of 1,032 km and a population of 175,267 at the 2006 census.
Plateau state Polytechnic is Located in this town. 
The postal code of the area is 932.

References

Local Government Areas in Plateau State